Wellington Damião Nogueira Marinho (born 13 June 1981) is a Brazilian footballer. He plays for São Bernardo FC.

In February 2006, he was signed by Sporting Braga. He then spent 3 more seasons in Europe. After without a club for a season, he signed a 1-year contract with São Bernardo FC.

References

External links
 2008–09 Profile at Portuguese Liga 
 

Brazilian footballers
Oeste Futebol Clube players
S.C. Braga players
OFI Crete F.C. players
Portimonense S.C. players
C.D. Santa Clara players
Primeira Liga players
Brazilian expatriate footballers
Brazilian expatriate sportspeople in Portugal
Expatriate footballers in Portugal
Brazilian expatriate sportspeople in Greece
Expatriate footballers in Greece
Association football central defenders
Footballers from São Paulo
1981 births
Living people